Dean and Me: Roadshow of an American Primary is a 2008 documentary film about Howard Dean and his campaign in the 2004 presidential election. Dean and Me was directed by Heath Eiden, co-produced by Eiden, Iris Cahn, and Deanna Kamiel.

The film features Dean, Al Franken, Michael Moore, Ted Kennedy, Walter Mondale, Hillary Clinton, Alexandra Pelosi, and many others.

Background 
Director Heath Eiden said that he conceived of the project after watching the artist who painted Dean's  gubernatorial portrait, which depicted the then-governor sitting in a canoe. The film was later renamed Lessons From an American Primary.

Distribution 
The film has been shown at several film festivals, including the Vermont International Film Festival, the Hartford International Film Festival, the SNOB (Somewhere North of Boston) Film Festival, the Minneapolis-St. Paul International Film Festival.

Legacy 
During the 2016 Democratic presidential primary, when fellow Vermonter Bernie Sanders was a candidate, Eiden revisited Dean and Me and said that the film shows that "Bernie campers can learn that, win or lose, Dean's movement is still very influential because he didn't give up".

References

External links
 
 
 Review at New England Film

2008 films
2008 documentary films
Documentary films about elections in the United States
Documentary films about American politicians
2004 United States presidential election in popular culture
2000s English-language films
2000s American films